The 33rd annual Ale Kino! International Young Audience Film Festival was held from 29 November to 6 December 2015. A number of 157 movies, released between the years of 1965 and 2015 took part.

The movies were presented in Multikino 51 cinema and Imperial Castle Cinema. A lot of additional events were held at the same time, like film workshops for the children and meetings with the filmmakers.

The movies were judged by eight different jury sets; professional and amateur, separate for the feature and short movies.

Awards

References

External links
 33rd Ale Kino! Official Homepage
 33rd Ale Kino! at the Internet Movie Database

Ale Kino! Festival
Ale Kino! Festival
Ale Kino! Festival, 33
Ale Kino! Festival
Ale Kino! Festival
2015 festivals in Europe